Istället för vykort (English: Instead of postcards) is a studio album by the Swedish-Dutch folk singer-songwriter Cornelis Vreeswijk. It is considered Vreeswijk's most political album.

Track listing

"Till Sara Lidman"
"Till Jack"
"Till Lewi Petrus"
"Till damtidningen Femina"
"Till Cleo mellan dig och mig"
"Till Svenska Säkerhetspolisen"
"Till Jan Myrdal"
"Från fångarna på Kumla"
"Till Riddarhuset"
"Till Riksbanken"
"Till Landsorganisationen LO"
"Till hans Exellens Statsminister Olof Palme"
"Till en gammal knarkare"
"Till redaktör Ulf Thorén julhelgen 1972"
"Till Gunnel" (Bonus-låt på cd-utgåvan)

Personnel 
 Cornelis Vreeswijk: vocal, guitar
 Rune Gustafsson: guitar
 Janne Schaffer: guitar
 Hans Rosén: guitar
 Red Mitchell: bass
 Sabu Martinez: Conga
 Johnny Martinez: Conga
 Björn Ståbi: violin
 Jan Lindgren: Steel Guitar

References

Cornelis Vreeswijk albums
1973 albums